The term Zapatero government may refer to:

Zapatero I Government, the government of Spain under José Luis Rodríguez Zapatero from 2004 to 2008.
Zapatero II Government, the government of Spain under José Luis Rodríguez Zapatero from 2008 to 2011.